The Uluwatu CT 2018 was an event of the 2018 World Surf League. It was held from 11 to 20 May at Uluwatu, Bali, Bali, Indonesia, and contested by 36 surfers.

Round 1

Round 2

Round 3

Round 4

Quarter finals

Semi finals

Final

References 

2018 World Surf League
Surfing competitions in Indonesia
2018 in Indonesian sport
Sport in Bali
May 2018 sports events in Asia